The Meiselberg is a hill in the 19th district of Vienna, Döbling. It is 291 metres tall

Geography 
The Meiselberg represents the north-eastern extension of the Schenkenberg and lies in the suburb of Sievering. The limits of the Meiselberg are defined by the Kaasgraben to the north and the Arbesbach to the south. The hill is part of a north-eastern chain of foothills belonging to the eastern Alps. It is composed of flysch containing quartz, limestone, marl, and other conglomerates.

History 
The name Meiselberg is probably a reference to the hill's steep ridge and most likely derives from the Middle High German meizel (meaning chisel). Today, the hill is sparsely settled, but in contrast to the surrounding hills, is not used for viticulture.

References 
 Kothbauer, Karl: Döbling - und seine Ried- und Flurnamen. Dissertation Wien 2001 

Döbling
Hills of Vienna